Le Luc (Provençal: Lo Luc), also known as Le Luc-en-Provence (Lo Luc de Provença), is a commune in the Var department in the Provence-Alpes-Côte d'Azur region in Southeastern France. In 2019, it had a population of 11,094. Le Luc is the seat of its own canton, the larger canton of Le Luc. Inhabitants of Le Luc are called Lucois (masculine) and Lucoises (feminine).

Climate
With an average of about 128 days per year (source: Météo Climat stats, calculated over the period 1981–2010), Le Luc is one of the communes with the highest number of "warm days" in France, that is to say, days for which the maximum temperature is greater than or equal to 25 °C.

As to "hot days", the average is of about 62 days per year (meaning maximum temperature greater or equal to 30 °C). As to "very hot days", the average is of about 9 days per year (meaning maximum temperature greater or equal to 35 °C).

Demographics

See also
Communes of the Var department

References

Communes of Var (department)